Since the advent of Ten-pin bowling, there have been many bowlers who have achieved fame for their excellence in the sport.  These bowlers have led to changes in game mechanics, new high scores, and increased interest in the game. The vast majority of these bowlers are professionals who have competed in national and international tournaments.

Living

Active

Jason Belmonte

Oscar Marin

François Lavoie

Clara Guerrero
Rocio Restrepo

Mai Ginge Jensen

Aumi Guerra

Verity Crawley
Dominic Barrett
Zara Glover
Nikki Harvey
Paul Moor
Kirsten Penny
Stuart Williams

Mika Koivuniemi
 Osku Palermaa

Jens Nickel
Achim Grabowski

Beatrix Pesek

Shaik Abdul Hameed
Shabbir Dhankot
Sabeena Saleem

Yūki Akiyoshi
Nachimi Itakura
Aino Kinjo
Hiromi Matsunaga
Ritsuko Nakayama
Aki Nawa
Miki Nishimura
Mika Sakai
Hiroko Shimizu
Akiko Tanigawa

Adrian Ang
Shalin Zulkifli
Muhammad Rafiq Ismail

Miriam Zetter (born 1989)

Tore Torgersen

Ijaz Ur Rehman

Olivia "Bong" Coo
Rafael Nepomuceno
Arianne Cerdeña
Liza del Rosario

Remy Ong
Jazreel Tan

Nina Flack
Helen Johnsson
Jesper Svensson

Patrick Allen
Diandra Asbaty
Tom Baker
Chris Barnes
Lynda Barnes
Leanne Barrette
Mookie Betts
Devin Bidwell
Parker Bohn III
John Burkett
Ryan Ciminelli
Jason Couch
Carolyn Dorin-Ballard
Kamron Doyle
Norm Duke
Mike Fagan
Gary Faulkner Jr.
Bryan Goebel
Michael Haugen Jr.
Tom Hess
Liz Johnson
Tommy Jones
Marshall Kent
Kelly Kulick
Chris Loschetter
Tim Mack
Shawn Maldonado
Wes Malott
Danielle McEwan
Bill O'Neill
Rhino Page
Randy Pedersen
Johnny Petraglia
Shannon Pluhowsky
Kristopher Prather
Sean Rash
Mike Scroggins
Anthony Simonsen
Tom Smallwood
Robert Smith
E. J. Tackett
William V. Thompson
Kyle Troup
Wayne Webb
Pete Weber
Walter Ray Williams, Jr.

Karen Marcano
Amleto Monacelli

Retired

Michael Schmidt

Melody Yeung

Mats Karlsson
Tomas Leandersson

Kim Adler
Mike Aulby
Del Ballard Jr.
Bob Benoit
George Branham III
Nelson (Bo) Burton, Jr.
Jeff Carter
Steve Cook
Dave Davis
Mike Durbin
Patrick Healey Jr.
Marshall Holman
Dave Husted
Doug Kent
John Mazza
Billy Oatman
David Ozio
George Pappas
Mark Roth
Carmen Salvino
Jess Stayrook
Guppy Troup
Danny Wiseman

Deceased

Earl Anthony
Don Carter
Buzz Fazio
Billy Hardwick
Don Johnson
John Jowdy
Andy Varipapa
Dick Weber
Billy Welu

References

Ten-pin bowling players